Gibberula chiarae is a species of very small sea snail, a marine gastropod mollusc or micromollusc in the family Cystiscidae.

Description
The length of the shell attains 4.05 mm.

Distribution
This marine species occurs off Madagascar.

References

chiarae
Gastropods described in 2009